Sagenidiopsis isidiata is a species of lichen in the family Arthoniaceae. Known from Guatemala, it was described as new to science in 2011.

References

Lichen species
Lichens described in 2011
Lichens of Central America
Roccellaceae
Taxa named by John Alan Elix
Taxa named by Robert Lücking
Taxa named by Harrie Sipman